Achilles tendinitis, also known as achilles tendinopathy, occurs when the Achilles tendon, found at the back of the ankle, becomes sore. Achilles tendinopathy is accompanied by alterations in the tendon's structure and mechanical properties. The most common symptoms are pain and swelling around the affected tendon. The pain is typically worse at the start of exercise and decreases thereafter. Stiffness of the ankle may also be present. Onset is generally gradual.

It commonly occurs as a result of overuse such as running. Other risk factors include trauma, a lifestyle that includes little exercise, high-heel shoes, rheumatoid arthritis, and medications of the fluoroquinolone or steroid class. Diagnosis is generally based on symptoms and examination.

There are several simple actions that individuals can take to prevent or reduce tendinitis. Though commonly used, some of these actions have limited or no scientific evidence to support them, namely pre-exercise stretching. Strengthening calf muscles, avoiding over-training, and selecting more appropriate footwear are more well-regarded options. Running mechanics can be improved with simple exercises that will help runners avoid achilles injury. Treatment typically involves rest, ice, non-steroidal antiinflammatory agents (NSAIDs), and physical therapy. In those whose symptoms last more than six months despite other treatments, surgery may be considered. Achilles tendinitis is relatively common.

Signs and symptoms
Symptoms can vary from an ache or pain and swelling to the local area of the ankles, or a burning that surrounds the whole joint. With this condition, the pain is usually worse during and after activity, and the tendon and joint area can become stiffer the following day as swelling impinges on the movement of the tendon. Many patients report stressful situations in their lives in correlation with the beginnings of pain which may contribute to the symptoms.

Achilles tendon injuries can be separated into insertional tendinopathy (20%–25% of the injuries), midportion tendinopathy (55%–65%), and proximal musculotendinous junction (9%–25%) injuries, according to the location of pain.

Cause

Achilles tendinitis is a common injury, particularly in sports that involve lunging and jumping. It is also a known side effect of fluoroquinolone antibiotics such as ciprofloxacin, as are other types of tendinitis.

Swelling in a region of micro-damage or partial tear can be detected visually or by touch.  Increased water content and disorganized collagen matrix in tendon lesions may be detected by ultrasonography or magnetic resonance imaging.

Achilles tendinitis is thought to have physiological, mechanical, or extrinsic (i.e. footwear or training) causes. Physiologically, the Achilles tendon is subject to poor blood supply through the synovial sheaths that surround it. This lack of blood supply can lead to the degradation of collagen fibers and inflammation. Tightness in the calf muscles has also been known to be involved in the onset of Achilles tendinitis.

During the loading phase of the running and walking cycle, the ankle and foot naturally pronate and supinate by approximately 5 degrees. Excessive pronation of the foot (over 5 degrees) in the subtalar joint is a type of mechanical mechanism that can lead to tendinitis.

An overuse injury refers to repeated stress and strain, which is likely the case in endurance runners. Overuse can simply mean an increase in running, jumping or plyometric exercise intensity too soon.  Another consideration would be the use of improper or worn-down footwear, which lack the necessary support to maintain the foot in the natural/normal pronation.

Pathophysiology

The Achilles tendon is the extension of the calf muscle and attaches to the heel bone. It causes the foot to extend (plantar flexion) when those muscles contract.

The Achilles tendon does not have good blood supply or cell activity, so this injury can be slow to heal. The tendon receives nutrients from the tendon sheath or paratendon. When an injury occurs to the tendon, cells from surrounding structures migrate into the tendon to assist in repair. Some of these cells come from blood vessels that enter the tendon to provide direct blood flow to increase healing. With the blood vessels come nerve fibers. Researchers including Alfredson and his team in Sweden  believe these nerve fibers to be the cause of the pain - they injected local anaesthetic around the vessels and this decreased significantly the pain from the Achilles tendon.

Diagnosis

Achilles tendinitis is usually diagnosed from a medical history, and  physical examination of the tendon. Projectional radiography shows calcification deposits within the tendon at its calcaneal insertion in approximately 60 percent of cases. Magnetic resonance imaging (MRI) can determine the extent of tendon degeneration, and may show differential diagnoses such as bursitis.

Prevention

Performing consistent physical activity will improve the elasticity and strength of the tendon, which will assist in resisting the forces that are applied.

While stretching before beginning an exercise session is often recommended, evidence to support this practice is limited. Prevention of recurrence includes following appropriate exercise habits and wearing low-heeled shoes. In the case of incorrect foot alignment, orthotics can be used to properly position the feet. Footwear that is specialized to provide shock-absorption can be utilized to defend the longevity of the tendon. Achilles tendon injuries can be the result of exceeding the tendon's capabilities for loading, therefore it is important to gradually adapt to exercise if someone is inexperienced, sedentary, or is an athlete who is not progressing at a steady rate.

Eccentric strengthening exercises of the gastrocnemius and soleus muscles are utilized to improve the tensile strength of the tendon and lengthen the musculotendinous junction, decreasing the amount of strain experienced with ankle joint movements. This eccentric training method is especially important for individuals with chronic Achilles tendinosis which is classified as the degeneration of collagen fibers. These involve repetitions of slowly lowering the body while standing on the affected leg, using the opposite arm and foot to assist in repeating the cycle, and starting with the heel in a hyperextended position. (Hyperextension is typically achieved by balancing the forefoot on the edge of a step, a thick book, or a barbell weight so that the point of the heel is a couple of inches above the forefoot.)

Treatment
Treatment typically involves rest, ice, non-steroidal antiinflammatory agents (NSAIDs), and physical therapy. A heel lift or orthotics may also be helpful, but evidence on both heel lifts and orthotics is limited. Foam rolling may increase range of motion, but there is only weak evidence for the direct treatment of stiffness. Other treatments include:
 An eccentric exercise routine designed to strengthen the tendon.
 Application of a boot or cast.

Injections
The evidence to support injection therapies is poor.
 This includes corticosteroid injections. These can also increase the risk of tendon rupture.
 Autologous blood injections - results have not been highly encouraging and there is little evidence for their use.

Procedures
Tentative evidence supports the use of extracorporeal shockwave therapy.

Epidemiology
The prevalence of Achilles tendinitis varies among different ages and groups of people. Achilles tendinitis is most commonly found in individuals aged 30–40 Runners are susceptible, as well as anyone participating in sports,
and men aged 30–39.

Risk factors include participating in a sport or activity that involves running, jumping, bounding, and change of speed. Although Achilles tendinitis is mostly likely to occur in runners, it also is more likely in participants in basketball, volleyball, dancing, gymnastics and other athletic activities. Other risk factors include gender, age, improper stretching, and overuse. Another risk factor is any congenital condition in which an individual's legs rotate abnormally, which in turn causes the lower extremities to overstretch and contract; this puts stress on the Achilles tendon and will eventually cause Achilles tendinitis.

References

External links 

Overuse injuries
Soft tissue disorders
Wikipedia medicine articles ready to translate